The Haraktas (in Tifinagh "ⵉⵃⵔⴽⴰⵜⵏ") or Ihrkatn in Berber language: Irakatin / "ⵉⵃⵔⴽⴰⵜⵏ" are an ethnic group found in eastern Algeria in the Aures (Ain Beida, Ma'athar in the wilaya of Batna, west of Souk Ahras and north of the wilaya of Khenchela), they speak the Algerian Shawiya language.

Language

The Harakat speaks the Shawiya language, and uses Standard Arabic in official documents and charters, as stipulated in the state constitution.

History

See also
Ain Beida
Chaoui people
Aures
Shawiya language
Algeria

References

Ethnic groups in Algeria